Jallo railway station (Urdu and ) is  located in Lahore District, Pakistan.

See also
 List of railway stations in Pakistan
 Pakistan Railways

References

External links

Railway stations in Lahore District
Railway stations on Lahore–Wagah Branch Line